Mangelia miorugulosa is a minute extinct species of sea snail, a marine gastropod mollusk in the family Mangeliidae.

Description
The length of the shell attains 5 mm.

Distribution
This extinct marine species was found in Miocene strata of Belgium and the Twistringer Schichten of Northern Germany.

References

 Kautsky, Fritz. "Das Miozän von Hemmoor und Basbeck-Osten." (1925); Abh. preuss. geol.Landesanst., N.F., 97: 1-255, Taf. 1-12

External links
 Worldwide Mollusc Species Data Base : Mangelia miorugulosa

miorugulosa
Gastropods described in 1925